Robert Merrifield, (born December 19, 1953) is a Canadian politician and diplomat.  He is the former Member of Parliament for Yellowhead, and was the Minister of State for Transport from October 2008 to May 2011. In September 2014 he resigned as a Member of the Canadian House of Commons to accept an appointment from Alberta Premier Jim Prentice to be the province's envoy to the United States in Washington, D.C. where he will lobby for approval of the Keystone XL pipeline.

His accomplishments included revitalizing Marine Atlantic with two new ferries, initiating Canada Post's postal transformation, and overseeing the rollout of Transport Canada's Alberta and Saskatchewan infrastructure funds as a part of Canada's Economic Action Plan.

Merrifield was first elected to represent Yellowhead in 2000.  He was re-elected in 2004, 2006, and 2008. Merrifield resigned his seat on September 17, 2014 to accept an appointment from Alberta Premier Jim Prentice as the province's envoy to the United States.

His past community involvement has included terms as chair and elected board member of the Whitecourt School District Board of Trustees, chair and vice-chair of the Whitecourt/Fox Creek Hospital Board, member of the Aspen Regional Health Authority, member of the Northern Gateway Regional Division No. 10 School Authority and elected member of the Woodland County Council.

References

External links
 Merrifeld's Website
 Merrifield's Member of Parliament Profile
 Rob Merrifield’s voting record

1953 births
Canadian Alliance MPs
Conservative Party of Canada MPs
Living people
Members of the 28th Canadian Ministry
Members of the House of Commons of Canada from Alberta
Members of the King's Privy Council for Canada
People from Lac Ste. Anne County
People from Whitecourt